The electoral division of Jordan was an electoral division in the Tasmanian Legislative Council of Australia. It existed from 1856 to 1885.

Members

See also
Tasmanian Legislative Council electoral divisions

References
Past election results for Jordan

Former electoral districts of Tasmania